Flip Simmons is an Australian actor and musician.

He is a graduate of St Edmund's College, Canberra & Brent Street – School of Performing Arts

Notably, he has performed with artists such as George Benson, Josh Groban, John Farnham, Delta Goodrem, Natalie Bassingthwaighte and the Rogue Traders, Christine Anu, Paulini, Sharon and Christine Muscat (Sister2Sister), Rob Guest, internet sensation Miranda Sings.

He is of English, Filipino, Irish, Spanish and Swedish heritage and is known to sing in multiple languages and genres. He has supported artists such as Anthony Castelo, Hajji Alejandro, Hannah Villame and the late Yoyoy Villame, on their Australian tours.

Film and television
Film and television credits include; AFI Award winning Lantana, The ARIA Music Awards, The Helpmann Awards, Good Morning Australia, Midday, Mornings with Kerri-Anne and Celebrate! Christmas in the Capital, along with number of short films and music videos.

In New York in 2001, Flip had castings for the Broadway and American touring companies of RENT for the roles of Angel and Mark, during which, his audition process was broadcast in a television special on the musical on America's Fox Network.

Theatre
Theatre work includes; extensive work with the Canberra Philharmonic, work with Opera Australia, touring Australia covering the role of Roger in Grease – The Arena Spectacular, and playing Nachum and Grandma Tzeitel next to the legendary Chaim Topol in the Australasian tour of Fiddler on the Roof.

He is currently playing the role of Ritchie Valens in the Australian tour of Buddy: The Buddy Holly Story in remembrance of the 50th anniversary of "The Day the Music Died".

Music
At the age of three, Flip was entered into the Yamaha School of Music to play piano.

In 2000, he was invited to join Mi Tierra – Australia's Leading Latin Band, as a singer, dancer and flute player. His work with Mi Tierra has taken him around the country playing the majority of Australia's most prestigious festivals and concert events, also working as lyricist and concert choreographer.

He has also worked with dynamic performance group 'The Next Step' at their sold-out shows 'Live at The Metro', their 'Do it on the dance floor' tour and at such festivals such as Splendour in the Grass.

Flip is one of the founding members of the Sydney musical collaboration Sexy Sunday Jam, a band formed of session musicians and performers from Australia who came to notoriety from a weekly, industry based, event on a Sunday night in Sydney established in 2010.

On Christmas 2014, he was a guest artist at the Pacific Grand Ballroom at the Waterfront in Cebu, Philippines, for the fashion designer Monique Lhuillier's family M Lhuillier's end of year party.

References

External links
General

 Flip Simmons – Website
 Flip Simmons – YouTube
  – Facebook

 Flip Simmons (@flipsimmons) | Twitter – Twitter
 Flip Simmons (@flipsimmons) • Instagram photos and videos – Instagram
  – Tumblr

Performance videos

 MIRANDA SINGS & FLIP SIMMONS – LIVE in Sydney, Australia "Suddenly Seymour" 23/11/09 – MIRANDA SINGS & FLIP SIMMONS – LIVE in Sydney, Australia "Suddenly Seymour" 23 November 2009
 Flip Simmons – Somewhere – "Somewhere" LIVE at Hats Off 2014
 Flip Simmons – Somewhere – Sexy Sunday Jam "Rather Be"
 YouTube – "Let it sing" FLOOD LIGHT – Queensland Charity Benefit, Slide – Sydney – 23 January 2011

 Madonna – Like a Prayer (Flip & Kuki) – FNK Madonna's Like a Prayer (Cover)
 YouTube – Flip Simmons performs 'I'll be here' at Trevor Ashley's 'Showqueen', at the Kit and Kaboodle Club in Sydney, May 2010. Filmed and edited by Chris Archer
 Beethoven Day – You're a good man Charlie Brown (Flip Simmons) – "Beethoven Day" from Canberra Philharmonic's You're a Good Man, Charlie Brown 2003

Living people
Male actors from Canberra
Male actors from Sydney
Australian male stage actors
Australian musicians
Australian male television actors
Australian people of Filipino descent
Australian people of Spanish descent
Australian people of Swedish descent
Year of birth missing (living people)